James Bloom (born 1975) is a creative director, director and screenwriter known for his work in television, advertising and interactive entertainment. He is the grandson of Freddy Bloom OBE.

Career
He was one of the youngest journalists at The Guardian newspaper, writing from the age of 19 and a contributing editor at GQ magazine from the age of 20. He also worked on the launch of Wired magazine in the UK with Tony Ageh OBE. He joined Ageh to launch Virgin.net, a leading ISP and entertainment channel subsequently bought out by cable TV provider NTL Incorporated.

He worked as a creative at advertising agency Lateral, creating award-winning campaigns for Levi's and Nationwide. He played a key role in the creation of the leading digital TV channel PlayJam at Static2358, sold to OpenTV for $59 million.

Working with Heroes creator Tim Kring, he wrote and directed the online series 'Conspiracy For Good' which was nominated for an International Emmy Award among other awards. His comedy viral 'Bass Jump' positioned No. 6 in Go Viral's chart. His advertising campaigns include work for Guinness, American Express, Barclaycard, Intel and Google.

His comedy film 'Love Your Neighbour' was funded by Working Title Films and the British Council, appearing at Edinburgh International Film Festival, Berlin International Film Festival, Portobello Film Festival and winning High Commendation at the TCM Classic Shorts Film Competition.

Bloom's screenplays have won a number of international screenwriting awards. He is also an exhibited artist.

References

1975 births
Living people
British film directors
British male screenwriters
British television directors
Creative directors
The Guardian journalists